Hayley McLean (born 9 September 1994) is a British hurdler who competes in international elite events. She was a 2013 European junior champion in the 400 metre hurdles in Rieti and had competed for England at the 2014 Commonwealth Games but did not qualify for the final.

References

1994 births
Living people
British female hurdlers
English female hurdlers
Athletes (track and field) at the 2014 Commonwealth Games